Douglas Jackson (born January 26, 1940) is a Canadian film and television director and producer. As a television director, he is best known for the 1983 CBC Television miniseries Empire, Inc., which he co-directed with Denys Arcand. Jackson began his film career in the 1960s on staff at the National Film Board of Canada (NFB). His NFB credits include producing Bill Mason's short documentary Blake, which was nominated for an Academy Award for Best Live Action Short Film.

Filmography

References

External links
 

1940 births
Living people
Canadian television directors
Film directors from Montreal
Anglophone Quebec people
National Film Board of Canada people
Canadian documentary film producers